Une ravissante idiote ( The Ravishing Idiot) is a 1964 French-Italian Cold War comedy film directed by Édouard Molinaro. François Billetdoux and André Tabet wrote a screenplay based on Charles Exbrayat 1962 novel of the same name. Brigitte Bardot and Anthony Perkins star as the protagonists in the Franco-Italian production.

The film was also released as Agent 38-24-36 in the United States.

Plot
A Soviet spy (Perkins) is on an official mission to obtain sensitive information from NATO about military mobilization. The klutzy intelligence operative has to rely on the instinct of his new partner and love-interest Penelope Lightfeather (Bardot) as they traipse across the countryside, avoiding counter intelligence agents and distrustful communist operatives.

Cast
Brigitte Bardot as Penelope Lightfeather
Anthony Perkins as Harry Compton / Nicholas Maukouline
Grégoire Aslan as Bagda
Jean-Marc Tennberg as Cartwright
Hans Verner as Farington
Jacques Monod as Surgeon

Production
The film was shot in London and the French countryside. Production was affected for three days after Perkins suffered a sprained ankle while filming chase scenes through the woods with Bardot.

As he was fluent in French, this is one of several French-language roles that Perkins took on.

Bibliography

References

External links
 

1964 films
1960s French-language films
Films based on French novels
French spy comedy films
Films directed by Édouard Molinaro
Cold War spy films
Films scored by Michel Legrand
1960s spy comedy films
1964 comedy films
1960s French films